Sibylla Sambetha (or simply Portrait of a Young Woman) is a small oil on oak panel painting by Hans Memling, completed in 1480 and still in its original frame. It is now in the Hans Memling museum at the Old St. John's Hospital in Bruges and shows a young woman who is not pretty, but nonetheless elegant and well dressed. She is set against a black background and looks out of the picture as if she is at a window. Her hands are folded and rest on the lower border of the brown marbled frame, in an early and effective example of trompe-l'œil.

The woman's identity is lost. There have been a number of attempts to associate her with a historical person, including in the 19th century, as Willem Moreel's daughter Mary. Willem Moreel was a magistrate of Bruges who commissioned from Memling a portrait diptych and, later, a triptych for the Church of Saint James at Bruges which he had founded. But any identities have in turn been rejected; in the case of Mary Moreel, she would have been too young in 1480 to be the woman portrayed.

The sitter wears a truncated hennin under a sheer veil which falls across her face and over her shoulders. She has very pale skin, and a fashionably high forehead, with her hair tightly pinned to fit under the head-dress. Her dress is dark purple or black – the colours have darkened from their original blue – with a white collar above a red breastplate or bodice.

The lower border of the frame contains a carved banderole with an inscription reading SIBYLLA SAMBETHA QUAE / EST PERSICA; associating the woman with the Persian Sibyl. A painted metal cartouche placed at the top left of the picture is a later addition, and contains the words "SIBYLLA SAMBETHA QVAE ET PERSICA, AN: ANTE CHRIST: NAT: 2040" (The Sibyl Sambetha, the Persian, in the year 2040 BC). The scroll at the end of the frame bears another later addition, the text of which refers to Mary with the words ECCE BESTIA CONCVLCABERIS, GIGNETVR D(OMI)NUS IN ORBEM TERRARVM ET CREATUM VIRGINIS ERIT SALVS GENTIVM, INVISIBILE VERBV PALPABITVR (Here let the serpent be trampled under your talon, let the Lord be born in the earthly realm, and the Virgin's creation will become the world's salvation: the invisible word will be made palpable).

References

Sources

 Blum, Shirley Neilsen. "Early Netherlandish Triptychs: A Study in Patronage". Speculum, Volume 47, No. 2, April 1972
 Eemans, Marc. "Hans Memling". Brusells: Meddens, 1970 
 Michiels, Albert. "Hans Memling". Sirrocco-Parkstone International, 2008. 
 Ridderbos, Bernhard; Van Buren, Anne; Van Veen, Henk. Early Netherlandish Paintings: Rediscovery, Reception and Research. Amsterdam: Amsterdam University Press, 2005. 

Paintings by Hans Memling
15th-century portraits
1480s paintings
Paintings in the Old St. John's Hospital